Massachusetts is the second wealthiest state in the United States of America, with a median household income of $77,378 (as of 2019), per capita income of $41,794 (as of 2018), and a personal per capita income of $39,815 (as of 2003). Many of the state's wealthiest towns are located in the Boston suburbs. This area includes a high concentration of wealthy cities and towns just to the west of Boston, in the MetroWest area, and along the northern and southern coastal regions that have easy access to the city, in particular the North Shore of Boston. Many summer communities are located along the shores of Cape Cod where wealthy second homeowners vacation, and there are several other wealthy communities located farther west than the Boston Metro area clustered in suburban areas around Worcester and in rural areas in far western parts of the state. All data is from the 2009–2013 American Community Survey 5-Year Estimates.

Counties

Cities and Towns

Ranking of Cities and Towns based on per capita income.

Sources
 http://www.massbenchmarks.org/statedata/data/median99.pdf
 https://www.census.gov/
 Garland, Joseph E., Boston's Gold Coast : the North Shore, 1890-1929, Boston, MA : Little, Brown & Co., 1981.

References

Massachusetts
Locations by per capita income
Locations by per capita income
Income